Komazan may refer to:
 Komazan, Hamadan
 Komazan, Markazi